Bota may refer to:

Places
 Bota, Perak Tengah District, Perak, Malaysia
 Isla Bota, an island in the Gulf of California
 Bridge of the Americas (El Paso–Ciudad Juárez) Mexico-USA
 Bota, Bacău County, Romania; a village in Ungureni, Bacău

People
 Alice Bota (born 1979) German journalist
 Alin Bota (born 1983) Romanian soccer goalkeep
 Kinga Bóta (born 1977) Hungarian sprint canoer
 Theodor Botă (born 1997) Romanian soccer player
 Victor Cesar Bota (born 1972) Brazilian filmmaker

 Jean-Chrysostome Raharison (born 1979) nicknamed "Bota"; Malagasy soccer player

Other uses
 Builders of the Adytum (B.O.T.A.), a Western spirituality society based in Los Angeles, California, USA
 B.O.T.A. tarot deck
 Bota bag, a style of Spanish wineskin
 Bota (film) 2014 Albanian drama film
B.O.T.A. (Baddest of Them All), song by British musician Eliza Rose

See also
 Botta (surname)
 Botas (disambiguation)